The 2012-2013 Elitserien was the sixth season of the Swedish bandy league Elitserien.

League table
At the end of the season.

Knock-out stage
A best-of-five playoff were used in the quarter-finals and semi-finals. The crucial final was played at Friends Arena in Solna, Stockholm at March 17, 2013.

Final

Season statistics

Top scorers

References

Elitserien (bandy) seasons
Bandy
Bandy
Elitserien
Elitserien